Emersonn Correia da Silva (born 16 July 2004), known simply as Emersonn, is a Brazilian footballer who plays as a forward for Athletico Paranaense.

Club career
Emersonn progressed through the academy of Athletico Paranaense, with his standout season coming in 2021, where he started the campaign with eight goals in only four games. In June of the same year, he signed his first professional contract with the club, a three-year deal. The following month, he was called up to the first team to cover for the injured Matheus Babi, but did not feature in any games.

In October 2022, he suffered a tear of his cruciate ligaments, which ruled him out until the second half of the 2023 season.

International career
Emersonn represented Brazil at the 2019 South American U-15 Championship, making four appearances.

References

2004 births
Living people
Brazilian footballers
Brazil youth international footballers
Association football forwards
Club Athletico Paranaense players